The R.A.F. Penrose Gold Medal was established in 1923 and is awarded by the Society of Economic Geologists (SEG) to recognize a full career in the performance of "unusually original work in the earth sciences". The medal was donated by American geologist and founding President of the SEG Richard A.F. Penrose Jr. At the time of its donation, Penrose was explicit in his desire that the medal be awarded for achievements in pure geological science, rather than in the application of science to the discovery of mineral deposits.

Recipients
Source: SEG

See also

 List of geology awards
 Prizes named after people
 Gold medal awards

References

Geology awards
1923 establishments in the United States
American science and technology awards
Awards established in 1923